José de Jesus Calderón Frias (born 14 August 1985) is a Panamanian footballer who plays as a goalkeeper for Liga Nacional club Xelajú.

Club career
He played for several teams in Panama before moving abroad to join Guatemalan side Heredia in 2012. He moved on to Coatepeque ahead of the 2014 Apertura season.

In May 2015, Calderón announced his departure from Coatepeque after the team was relegated.

International career
Calderón has been one of the only members of the Panama U-20 squad who have participated in both the 2003 FIFA World Youth Cup in the United Arab Emirates and in the 2005 FIFA World Youth Cup in the Netherlands.

He made his senior debut for Panama in a friendly match against Bahrain on 27 October 2005 and has, as of 1 June 2015, earned a total of 11 caps, scoring no goals. He was selected as a reserve for the 2005, 2007 and 2009 CONCACAF Gold Cups but did not play. Calderón was also part of the team that won the 2009 UNCAF Nations Cup in Honduras.

In May 2018 he was named in Panama’s preliminary 35 man squad for the 2018 FIFA World Cup in Russia.

Career statistics

International

Honors
Panama
 UNCAF Nations Cup: 2009

References

External links

1985 births
Living people
Sportspeople from Panama City
Association football goalkeepers
Panamanian footballers
Panama international footballers
Copa Centroamericana-winning players
Chepo FC players
San Francisco F.C. players
Unión Deportivo Universitario players
C.D. Árabe Unido players
Heredia Jaguares de Peten players
Deportivo Coatepeque players
Platense F.C. players
Real Cartagena footballers
C.D. Marathón players
C.D. Guastatoya players
Comunicaciones F.C. players
Panamanian expatriate footballers
Liga Panameña de Fútbol players
Liga Nacional de Fútbol de Guatemala players
Categoría Primera B players
2005 CONCACAF Gold Cup players
2007 CONCACAF Gold Cup players
2009 UNCAF Nations Cup players
2009 CONCACAF Gold Cup players
2015 CONCACAF Gold Cup players
Copa América Centenario players
2017 Copa Centroamericana players
2017 CONCACAF Gold Cup players
2018 FIFA World Cup players
2019 CONCACAF Gold Cup players
2021 CONCACAF Gold Cup players
Expatriate footballers in Guatemala
Expatriate footballers in Colombia
Expatriate soccer players in the United States
Panamanian expatriate sportspeople in Guatemala
Panamanian expatriate sportspeople in Colombia
Panamanian expatriate sportspeople in the United States